Widdifield is a surname. Notable people with the surname include:

John Wesley Widdifield (1869–1943), Canadian politician
Joseph Henry Widdifield (1845–1906), Canadian politician